Gustav Forsling (born 12 June 1996) is a Swedish professional ice hockey defenceman for the Florida Panthers of the National Hockey League (NHL). Forsling was selected by the Vancouver Canucks in the fifth round (126th overall) of the 2014 NHL Entry Draft.

Playing career
A product of Linköpings HC, Forsling made his senior Swedish Hockey League debut with the club during the 2014–15 SHL season. After his selection by the Vancouver Canucks in the 2014 NHL Entry Draft, Forsling's NHL rights were traded to the Chicago Blackhawks in exchange for Adam Clendening on 29 January 2015.

On 11 May 2016, he inked a three-year contract with the Chicago Blackhawks. He made the Blackhawks opening night roster to begin his first North American season in 2016–17. On 13 November 2016, Forsling scored his first NHL goal in a 3–2 win, against Al Montoya of the Montreal Canadiens. He was later reassigned to AHL affiliate, the Rockford IceHogs on 6 January 2017.

On 24 June 2019, Forsling was traded by the Blackhawks, along with Anton Forsberg to the Carolina Hurricanes in exchange for Calvin de Haan and Aleksi Saarela.

On 8 January 2021, Forsling was placed on waivers by the Hurricanes prior to the delayed 2020–21 season. The following day, he was subsequently claimed by the Florida Panthers.

On July 15, 2021, the Panthers signed Forsling to a three-year, $8 million contract extension.

International play
Forsling represented Sweden's junior national teams on several occasions. Serving as captain for Team Sweden, he was named to the All-Star Team at the 2016 World Junior Championship. He earned his first caps with Sweden's men's national team during the 2015–16 Euro Hockey Tour.

Personal life
Forsling has an older brother, Hampus and a younger brother, Hannes who both play for Linköpings HC.

Career statistics

Regular season and playoffs

International

References

External links

1996 births
Living people
Charlotte Checkers (2010–) players
Chicago Blackhawks players
Florida Panthers players
Linköping HC players
Rockford IceHogs (AHL) players
Swedish ice hockey defencemen
Vancouver Canucks draft picks
Sportspeople from Linköping